Inquisitor zebra is a species of sea snail, a marine gastropod mollusk in the family Pseudomelatomidae, the turrids and allies.

Description
The length of the shell attains 10 mm

Distribution
This marine species occurs in the Indian Ocean off Réunion and also in the China seas.

References

 Liu J.Y. [Ruiyu] (ed.). (2008). Checklist of marine biota of China seas. China Science Press. 1267 pp.

External links

 Lamarck [J.-B. M.] de. (1822). Histoire naturelle des animaux sans vertèbres. Tome septième. Paris: published by the Author, 711 pp
 Gastropods.com: Inquisitor zebra

zebra
Gastropods described in 1822